Martti Wallén (born 20 November 1948) is a Finnish operatic bass singer. Born in Helsinki, he sang both internationally and in his native country where he was a visiting soloist at the Finnish National Opera for many years. He created the role of the Judge in the world premiere of Aulis Sallinen's The Horseman in 1975.

Life and career
Wallén was born in Helsinki and initially studied in an Orthodox theological seminary. After completing his studies as a cantor in 1968, he studied voice with Pekka Salomaa at the Sibelius Academy in Helsinki, with Torsten Föllinger in Stockholm and Luigi Ricci and Achille Braschi in Rome. He served as the cantor for the Helsinki Orthodox congregation for several years and made his operatic debut as Colline in La bohème in 1973 at the Finnish National Opera, where he was a regular visiting soloist from 1975.

In 1975 Wallén joined the Royal Swedish Opera in Stockholm, where he was a soloist until his retirement in 2000. His last Royal Opera performance was in 2004. In 1980 – 1982 he was a soloist at the opera in Gelsenkirchen, Germany.

Wallén has appeared as a soloist internationally, including Moscow (Bolshoi Theatre), Tallinn (Estonia Theatre), Gelsenkirchen, Wiesbaden, Zurich, Manchester, Leeds, Los Angeles, Antwerp, Brussels and Brugge. From 1970 to 1979 he was a soloist at the Savonlinna Opera Festival, where he sang the role of the Judge in the world premiere of Aulis Sallinen's The Horseman in 1975. He has also appeared at the Helsinki Festival, the Naantali Festival, and several other festivals and recitals in the Nordic countries.

Both of his children, Herman Wallén (tenor), and Ida Wallén (mezzosoprano) work as professional singers in Germany.

Repertoire
Among Wallén's most important roles were:
Mozart: Sarastro (The Magic Flute), Leporello (Don Giovanni)
Beethoven: Rocco (Fidelio)
Musorgsky: Pimen (Boris Godunov)
Rossini: Basilio (The Barber of Seville)
Strauss: Ochs (Der Rosenkavalier)
Tchaikovsky: Gremin (Eugene Onegin)
Verdi: Sparafucile (Rigoletto), Philip II (Don Carlos)
Wagner: Daland (The Flying Dutchman), Pogner (The Mastersingers of Nuremberg), Fasolt (Das Rheingold), Hunding (Die Valkyrie), Landgraf (Tannhäuser)
Kokkonen: Paavo Ruotsalainen (The Last Temptations)

Wallén has sung several other roles in Finnish contemporary operas.

Recordings
In addition to several recordings of Finnish Christmas songs and Orthodox church music, Wallén has recorded
Sallinen: The Horseman (as the Judge) – Savonlinna Opera Festival Chorus and Orchestra conducted by Ulf Söderblom. Label: Finlandia
Bergman: The Singing Tree (as the Peddler) – Tapiola Chamber Choir, Dominante Choir, Finnish National Opera Orchestra conducted by Ulf Söderblom. Label: Ondine
Verdi: Don Carlos (as the Old Monk) – Royal Stockholm Opera Orchestra and Chorus conducted by Alberto Hold-Garrido. Label: Naxos.

References 

1948 births
Living people
20th-century Finnish male opera singers
Operatic basses
Singers from Helsinki
Finnish basses
21st-century Finnish male opera singers